Eugénie Bastié (born 18 November 1991) is a French journalist and essayist.

A  Le Figaro employee, she is also editor in chief of the integral ecology magazine Limite, of Catholic inspiration. In 2016, she published a critical essay on feminism, Adieu mademoiselle.  A conservative, she is part of a generation of young Catholic intellectuals.  The Nation in 2018 described her as "a rising star."

Childhood and education 
Daughter of a landscaper and a specialist in nuclear medicine, Eugénie Bastié has four brothers and sisters; she grew up in Pibrac, in the Haute-Garonne in a Catholic family.

Career 
She partook in 2013 in the Manif pour tous. From 2013 to 2015 she collaborated with Causeur, an internet site and biweekly magazine directed by Élisabeth Lévy.

Following an internship at Figarovox, the opinion and debate site of  Le Figaro (considered by Nolwenn Le Blevennec, from L'Obs, as the "hard right platform of Le Figaro"), she was hired by Le Figaro in 2014, recommended by Alexis Brézet.

In 2015, Bastié co-founded the French ecologist "Limite" magazine.

Bastié has compared Marine Le Pen "a little bit" to Hillary Clinton.

The Huffington Post has reported that Bastié's comments on #metoo have "created a controversy."

Works 

 .
 .
 .

References 

1991 births
Living people
Sciences Po alumni
Paris-Sorbonne University alumni
Female critics of feminism
French anti-abortion activists
French Roman Catholics
French women journalists
French women non-fiction writers
Writers from Toulouse
Le Figaro people